Juvvadi Chokka Rao (born 19 July 1923 – 28 May 1999) was a political leader of Indian National Congress from Telangana. He served as member of the Lok Sabha representing Karimnagar (Lok Sabha constituency). He was elected to 8th Lok Sabha, 9th Lok Sabha and 10th Lok Sabha.

Life
Chokka Rao was born in Karimnagar district, Hyderabad state (now in Telangana). His political career first started with the cooperative movement in Andhra Pradesh and fighting for the freedom of Hyderabad State.

His tenure in the Lok Sabha was characterized by advocacy for rural and agricultural communities. Prior to his time serving as a Member of Parliament, he served in the Andhra Pradesh Legislative Assembly and held several ministerships, including Minister for Industries, in the Andhra Pradesh government. In foreign policy, Chokka Rao advocated for Tibet and its autonomy during his time in the Lok Sabha.

In honor of his service, the lift irrigation project, J. Chokka Rao Devadula lift irrigation sceheme, was named in his memory.

References

India MPs 1991–1996
People from Karimnagar district
1923 births
1999 deaths
India MPs 1989–1991
India MPs 1984–1989
Lok Sabha members from Andhra Pradesh